A Tribute to Sonata Arctica is a Sonata Arctica cover album released through independent Scottish record label Ouergh Records.

Background
Originating as a Kickstarter project, the crowd-funding effort raised £5946.00 towards creation of the album. Various established bands within the power metal and symphonic metal genres participated on the album, including Xandria, Stream of Passion and Van Canto. The album also features the first studio recording by the band Timeless Miracle since 2005 album Into The Enchanted Chamber. Pasi Kauppinen of Sonata Arctica also mastered the release, with artwork being created by Jan Yrlund.

A Tribute to Sonata Arctica went through several setbacks during its release cycle. The record label announced that Morlich would no longer be performing Respect The Wilderness on the album due to unforeseen circumstances. The initial release date of July 3, 2015 failed to be met, and the album was later delayed until September 12, 2015, where it was released as a download version, with a physical release following in December. Ouergh Records then went silent. The label failed to ship physical copies to backers despite physical copies being purchasable from their bandcamp page by those who did not back the kickstarter project for approximately 1 year after the project had been completed.

Track listing

References

Tribute albums
Sonata Arctica
2015 albums
Power metal albums